The Green Pastures is a 1936 American film depicting stories from the Bible as visualized by black characters. It starred Rex Ingram (in several roles, including "De Lawd"), Oscar Polk, and Eddie "Rochester" Anderson. It was based on the 1928 novel Ol' Man Adam an' His Chillun by Roark Bradford and the 1930 Pulitzer Prize-winning play of the same name by Marc Connelly.

The Green Pastures was one of only six feature films in the Hollywood Studio era to feature an all-black cast, though elements of it were criticised by civil rights activists at the time and subsequently.

Plot summary

An elderly black woman reads from the Book of Genesis to a group of six young children in her house. She answers their questions about God and creation.

One of the girls starts to visualise heaven...

We enter the pearly gates to an all-black heaven, with winged angels sitting on clouds.

The Lord, Jehovah, appears dressed in a black double-breasted jacket. He is given a cup of custard to test. This inspires him to create "a whole mess of firmament". But the firmament is wet so he creates drainage and mountains to let the water gather in rivers and seas. He leaves Gabriel in charge and goes down to inspect his work. Just before leaving he creates "man".

Adam appears next a tree (fully clothed). God walks up and says Adam needs a family. He creates Eve (fully clothed) and tells them to enjoy themselves, but forbids them from eating from one tree.

Back in the old lady's house, she quizzes the children and they explain the story of Cain and Abel.

In heaven Jehovah decides to visit earth again and finds a sassy young woman playing music and chastises her for doing this on a Sunday. She gives her name as Zeba. Her boyfriend Cain appears in a zoot suit and Jehovah leaves. He finds a circle of men kneeling and saying "praise the Lord", but they are playing dice, and he is shocked. He bemoans man's sinning. Then he meets a preacher, brother Noah, who invites him to dinner. Noah's wife is cooking chicken. Noah's knee twitches as it is going to rain. This gives Jehovah an idea... he will make it rain for 40 days and 40 nights. He tells Noah that he will destroy the world, but Noah must build a boat and place two of every animal on the boat... even the snakes. He also allows him one keg of liquor. He draws what to build and says he is to call it the Ark.

The people laugh at Noah building the Ark. A scuffle starts in the crowd and Cain stabs Big Joe and kills him. Noah starts to load the ark as the rain starts.

Back with old lady, she explains that everyone was drowned.

On the waters Shem releases a dove from the Ark. The dove returns with a green sprig, proving that it had found land.

But the sinning resumes on the new world. Jehovah complains that man takes up too much of his time. He asks for Abraham, Isaac and Jacob (who are older angels). He asks them to help Moses, who is on earth talking with his wife Zipporah. He shows him a burning bush. He asks him to lead his people out of bondage in Egypt. He gives him a rod...

In Egypt the pharaoh is being entertained by magicians. Moses arrives and wants to show him a trick: he lays down the rod and it changes into a snake. He asks Pharaoh to let the Hebrew slaves go. Pharaoh says no and Moses creates a swarm of bees. Moses strikes the Pharaoh's son dead and Pharaoh releases the Hebrews. They go to a mountain. Moses is old because they have been wandering in the wilderness for 40 years. Moses tells them to walk around Jericho and blow their ramshorns.

Cast
 Rex Ingram as De Lawd Jehovah / Adam / Hezdrel
 Oscar Polk as Gabriel
 Eddie "Rochester" Anderson as Noah
 Frank Wilson as Moses
 George H. Reed as Mr. Deshee / Aaron
 Abraham Gleaves as Archangel
 Myrtle Anderson as Eve
 Al Stokes as Cain
 Edna Mae Harris as Zeba
 James Fuller as Cain the Sixth
 George Randol as High Priest
 Ida Forsyne as Noah's Wife
 Ray Martin as Shem
 Charles Andrews as Flatfoot
 Dudley Dickerson as Ham
 Jimmy Burress as Japheth
 Billy Cumby as Abraham / Head Magician / King of Babylon
 Ivory Williams as Jacob
 David Bethea as Aaron
 Ernest Whitman as Pharaoh
 Reginald Fenderson as Joshua
 Slim Thompson as Master of Ceremonies
 Clinton Rosemond as Prophet
 Hall Johnson Choir as Vocal Ensemble
 Willie Best as Henry - the Angel (uncredited) 
 Jesse Graves as General (uncredited) 
 Clarence Muse as Angel (uncredited) 
 Fred Toones as Zubo (uncredited)
 Lillian Davis as Viney Prohack (uncredited)

Reception
Despite criticisms about its racial stereotyping, The Green Pastures proved to be an enormously popular film. On its opening day at New York's Radio City Music Hall, tickets sold at a rate of 6,000 per hour. The film was held over for an entire year's run at some theaters. It remained the highest-grossing all-black-cast film until the release of Carmen Jones in 1954.

Writing for The Spectator in 1936, Graham Greene gave the film a generally good review, speculating that audiences "will find [it] continuously entertaining, if only intermittently moving". Greene praised director Connelly in particular, describing scenes of "excellent" melodrama, his "ingenious [use of] pathos", and the "admirable" restraint evident in the simplicity of the settings.

Greene's only complaints about the film was that "one may feel uneasy at Mr. Connelly's humour" and his depiction of "the negro mind". Greene observed "the  result is occasionally patronising, too often quaint, and at the close of the film definitely false", but ultimately he concludes that the film is "as good a religious play as one is likely to get in this age from a practiced New York writer".

A review in The New York Times under the byline of "B.R.C.," while portraying the "shuffling" of its opening-night audience in terms that might be deemed racist, praised the sincerity of the production's religiosity and the aplomb of its cast, seeing in the movie "not only the 'divine comedy of the modern theatre' but something of the faith that moves mountains."

See also
 List of films about angels

References

External links

 
 
 
 

1936 films
African-American drama films
American black-and-white films
Films based on the Hebrew Bible
Films based on American novels
American films based on plays
Films directed by William Keighley
Warner Bros. films
1936 drama films
Cultural depictions of Adam and Eve
Cultural depictions of Cain and Abel
Cultural depictions of Abraham
Portrayals of Moses in film
Cultural depictions of Ramesses II
Cultural depictions of Noah
Fiction about God
Films based on adaptations
Films scored by Erich Wolfgang Korngold
1930s English-language films
1930s American films